Galakhov is a Russian masculine surname, its feminine counterpart is Galakhova. It may refer to
Aleksandr Galakhov (born 1981), Russian football player 
Alexey Galakhov (1807–1892), Russian author and literary historian
Nikolai Galakhov (born 1928), Russian artist

Russian-language surnames